Azor (also Azur) is a small town (local council) in the Tel Aviv District of Israel, on the old Jaffa-Jerusalem road southeast of Tel Aviv. Established in 1948 on the site of the depopulated Palestinian village of Yazur, Azor was granted local council status in 1951.

Etymology
Azor was named for the ancient city of Azur (lit. mighty, heroic), preserved in the name of the Palestinian village of Yazur.  The council of the new village named it Mishmar HaShiv'a ('Guardian of the Seven') in honour of seven Jewish soldiers killed near there in 1948, but the government committee in charge of assigning names forced them to change it to Azor on the grounds that preserving Biblical names was more important. However, another new village nearby was later named Mishmar HaShiv'a.

History
the 16th century, Haseki sultan endowed the lands of Yazur to its  Jerusalem soup kitchen. During the 18th and 19th centuries, the area belonged to the Nahiyeh (sub-district) of Lod that encompassed the area of the present-day city of Modi'in-Maccabim-Re'ut in the south to the present-day city of El'ad in the north, and from the foothills in the east, through the Lod Valley to the outskirts of Jaffa in the west. This area was home to thousands of inhabitants in about 20 villages, who had at their disposal tens of thousands of hectares of prime agricultural land.

For further information, see on the page of the preceding Palestinian village, Yazur.

Notable residents

Shelly Krolitzky (born 1999), tennis player
Matvey Natanzon, backgammon player
Margalit Tzan'ani, singer and tv personality

Main sights
 , archaeological museum

References

Local councils in Tel Aviv District